The National Institute of Migration (INM) is a unit of the government of Mexico dependent on the Secretariat of the Interior that controls and supervises migration in the country.

Programs

Paisano program
During the Presidency of Carlos Salinas de Gortari, the Paisano program was created to assist Mexican nationals returning to Mexico for temporary visits.

Grupo Beta
Grupos Beta (Beta Groups) is a service by the National Institute of Migration (INM) of Mexico offering water, medical aid, and information to immigrants at risk within the Mexican borders.

OPIS
Officials of Child Protection 'OFICIALES DE PROTECCIÓN A LA INFANCIA' (OPIS) are Mexican Federal Migration Agents whose main task is to ensure respect for the human rights of children and adolescent migrants, especially children unaccompanied by an adult.

2015 Temporary Migrant Regularization Program
The Programa Temporal de Regularización Migratoria (PTRM) published on 12 January 2015 in the Diario Oficial de la Federación, is aimed at those foreigners who have made their permanent residence in Mexico but due to 'diverse circumstances' did not regularize their stay in the country and find themselves turning to 'third parties' to perform various procedures, including finding employment.

The program is aimed at foreign nationals who entered the country before 9 November 2012. Foreigners wishing to live and be part of the national life of Mexico, will receive through the PTRM the status of 'temporary resident' by an immigration document that is valid for four years. The temporary program will run from 13 January to 18 December 2015.

In accordance with the provisions of Articles: 1, 2, 10, 18, 77, 126 and 133 of the Ley de Migración; 1 and 143 of the Reglamento de la Ley de Migración, any foreign national wishing to regularize their immigration status within Mexican territory, under the PTRM will complete the payment of fees for the following:

I. Proof of payment for receiving and examining the application of the procedure... ... MXN 1124.00 (USD 77.14 as of 12 January 2015)

II . For the issuance of the certificate giving them the status of temporary stay for four years ...... MXN 7914.00 (USD 514.17)

For people of low income or the vulnerable, Article 16 of the Ley Federal de Derechos will exempt them from payment if it can be proven that the foreign national earns a wage at or below minimum wage. During the period that the PTRM is in effect, no fine will be applied (as is the practice otherwise).

Offices

Since 1999, the INM approved the increase from 16 to 32 regional offices, one for every state of Mexico and the Federal District. It also has 45 migration stations concentrated on border states (land), Mexico City (air) and the Gulf of Mexico (sea). These stations are:

Immigration statistics

2004
 People who traveled to other countries through Mexico: 114,000
 Number of undocumented immigrants:
By outcome
Deported out of Mexico: 211,218
Detained in Mexico: 215,695
By country of origin:
 Guatemala: 42.9%
 Honduras: 33.7%
 El Salvador: 17.9%
 Nicaragua: 1.3%
 Other: 4.2%
 Foreign visitors registered and documented: 23,048,000
 Foreign people, permanently residing in Mexico, re-entering the country: 1,582
 Temporary workers from Guatemala re-entering the country: 41,894
 Foreign people entering the country temporarily: 19,614,710
By reason of entry
 Tourists: 8,770,686
 Business travelers: 413,619
 Other: 10,430,405
 People who entered to apply for residency: 8,513
 People who received Mexican citizenship: 1,582
 People who regularized their immigration status: 4,373
By country:
 Guatemala: 1,332
 Honduras: 1,046
 El Salvador: 492
 Colombia: 307
 Nicaragua: 161
 Peru: 155
 Other countries: 650
By state of residence:
 Chiapas: 1,571
 Federal District: 517
 Baja California: 305
 Jalisco: 266
 Quintana Roo: 222
 Tamaulipas: 275
 Campeche: 160
 Chihuahua: 119
 Veracruz: 108
By gender:
Women: 2,214
Men: 2,159

2017 report

A 2017 report commissioned by the Instituto Nacional de Migración argued that migrants from Guatemala, Honduras and El Salvador were subjected to physical, verbal and sexual abuse in its detention centers, including solitary confinement, death threats  and unwanted sexual contact. The INM refuted the claims.

References

External links

  

Government of Mexico
Demographics of Mexico
Immigration to Mexico
Human rights organizations based in Mexico